Le braci ("Embers") is a 2015 Italian opera by Marco Tutino after the novel Embers by Sándor Márai.

Recording
Roberto Scandiuzzi (bass, Henrik), Pavol Kuban (tenor, Young Henrik), Davide Giusti (tenor, Young Konrad), Romina Tomasoni (mezzo-soprano, Nini), Alfonso Antoniozzi (bass, Konrad), Angela Nisi (soprano, Kristina) Orchestra Internazionale d’Italia, Francesco Cilluffo; Recorded July 2015 Palazzo Ducale, Martina Franca, Italy Dynamic 2CD

References

Operas
2015 operas
Operas based on novels
Italian-language operas